Usingeriessa hemilitha is a moth in the family Crambidae. It was described by Edward Meyrick in 1936. It is found in Venezuela.

References

Acentropinae
Moths described in 1936